Stade Municipal is a multi-purpose stadium in Kenitra, Morocco which has been inaugurated in 1941. It is currently used mostly for football matches and is the home stadium of KAC Kenitra.  The stadium has a capacity up to 40,000.

References

Football venues in Morocco
Multi-purpose stadiums in Morocco
Sport in Kenitra
Buildings and structures in Rabat-Salé-Kénitra
KAC Kénitra